The Elfin Forest Natural Area is a nature preserve protecting a unique plant community in Los Osos-Baywood Park, San Luis Obispo County, central California.

Description
The Elfin Forest Natural Area covers 90 acres that have been acquired by The Los Osos / Morro Bay Chapter of Small Wilderness Area Preservation (SWAP) since 1988. The land was accepted by and now belongs to San Luis Obispo County Parks and California State Parks. The transfer's acceptance by the agencies was based on ongoing active stewardship by SWAP, which continues to the present day. The nature preserve opened to the public in 1994.

Natural history
The native Coast live oak (Quercus agrifolia) trees compose an elfin forest, in a naturally harsh location with poor soil conditions, salt spray, and constant winds, that have stunted and directed their growth.

There are several other native plants of pygmy forest scale in the nature preserve, also adapted to the harsh habitat, including the locally endemic Morro manzanita (Arctostaphylos morroensis).

Habitats in the nature reserve, within the California coastal sage and chaparral ecoregion, include:
Coastal sage scrub
Coastal brackish marsh
Riparian woodland fringe 
Pygmy oak woodland
Maritime chaparral
Coastal dune scrub
Oak and manzanita complex.

The Elfin Forest supports more than 200 species of plants, 51 species of lichens, as well as 110 kinds of birds, 22 species of mammals, and 13 species of reptiles and amphibians.

Access
A nearly  boardwalk loop, constructed in 1999 to protect the Elfin Forest's sensitive habitats, provides access for young and old, walkers and wheelchair users. Viewpoint sections along it have expansive overlooks over Morro Bay and the sand dunes spit, and the diverse bird species in the estuary.

Chumash people
In pre-Columbian times, the Chumash people had a significant settlement now named Los Osos Back Bay on a stabilized sand dune to the east of the Elfin Forest. There is a long Chumash midden within the dwarf forest.

See also
Los Osos Oaks State Natural Reserve — another unique oak woodland forest park, also in Los Osos-Baywood Park.
Natural history of San Luis Obispo County
Elfin forest
Pygmy forest
Pedology (soil study)

References

External links

Elfin-forest.org: Official El Moro Elfin Forest Natural Preserve website — info, images, biota lists, maps.
California State Parks, San Luis Obispo Coast: Elfin Forest Natural Preserve
Elfin Forest photo gallery
Hikespeak.com: Elfin Forest Natural Preserve — images.

Parks in San Luis Obispo County, California
Nature reserves in California
Morro Bay
California chaparral and woodlands
Estuaries of California
Forests of California
Marshes of California
Natural history of San Luis Obispo County, California
Chumash
Landforms of San Luis Obispo County, California
Protected areas established in 1988
1988 establishments in California